The 2007 New York Dragons season was the 12th season for the franchise. They look to make the playoffs again after finishing 2006 with a 10–6 record. They went 5–11 and missed the playoffs.

Schedule

Personnel moves

Acquired

Departures

2007 roster

Coaching
Weylan Harding started his third season as head coach of the Dragons.

Stats

Offense

Quarterback

Running backs

Wide receivers

Touchdowns

Defense

Special teams

Kick return

Kicking

Regular season

Week 1: vs Dallas Desperados

Scoring Summary:

1st Quarter:

2nd Quarter:

3rd Quarter:

4th Quarter:

Week 3: at Chicago Rush

Scoring Summary:

1st Quarter:

2nd Quarter:

3rd Quarter:

4th Quarter:

Week 4: at Tampa Bay Storm

Scoring Summary:

1st Quarter:

2nd Quarter:

3rd Quarter:

4th Quarter:

Week 5: vs Philadelphia Soul

Scoring Summary:

1st Quarter:

2nd Quarter:

3rd Quarter:

4th Quarter:

Week 6: at Grand Rapids Rampage

Scoring Summary:

1st Quarter:

2nd Quarter:

3rd Quarter:

4th Quarter:

Week 7: vs Colorado Crush

Scoring Summary:

1st Quarter:

2nd Quarter:

3rd Quarter:

4th Quarter:

Week 8: at Orlando Predators

Scoring Summary:

1st Quarter:

2nd Quarter:

3rd Quarter:

4th Quarter:

Week 9: vs Arizona Rattlers

Scoring Summary:

1st Quarter:

2nd Quarter:

3rd Quarter:

4th Quarter:

Week 10: at Columbus Destroyers

Scoring Summary:

1st Quarter:

2nd Quarter:

3rd Quarter:

4th Quarter:

Week 11: at Philadelphia Soul

Scoring Summary:

1st Quarter:

2nd Quarter:

3rd Quarter:

4th Quarter:

Week 12: vs Kansas City Brigade

Scoring Summary:

1st Quarter:

2nd Quarter:

3rd Quarter:

4th Quarter:

Week 13: at New Orleans VooDoo

Scoring Summary:

1st Quarter:

2nd Quarter:

3rd Quarter:

4th Quarter:

Week 14: vs Austin Wranglers

Scoring Summary:

1st Quarter:

2nd Quarter:

3rd Quarter:

4th Quarter:

Week 15: vs Orlando Predators

Scoring Summary:

1st Quarter:

2nd Quarter:

3rd Quarter:

4th Quarter:

Week 16: at Dallas Desperados

Scoring Summary:

1st Quarter:

2nd Quarter:

3rd Quarter:

4th Quarter:

Week 17: vs Columbus Destroyers

Scoring Summary:

1st Quarter:

2nd Quarter:

3rd Quarter:

4th Quarter:

New York Dragons
New York Dragons seasons